Marita Elisabeth Lindquist (née Gustafson; 10 November 1918 – 7 June 2016) was a Finnish author of many children's books. Born in Helsinki, she was of the Swedish-speaking population of Finland. In addition, she had written song lyrics, illustrated books, and worked as a translator, materials writer, producer, editor, and journalist.

Lindquist graduated from high school in 1937 and then studied languages. She was the author of hundreds of song texts and poems. Her repertoire included about forty children's books (usually the characters are fictional but for instance in Santtu Ellinoora series they were inspired by her grandchildren).

At the time of her death, Lindquist was already a widow and had two daughters – Marika and Anki, a folk singer (1945–2007). She has received many awards (see Awards section), including National Literature Prize (1973, 1975) and Topelius Award (1982). Her books have been translated into many foreign languages.

Bibliography
 Malenas nya bror, 1964
 Malena börjar skolan, 1966
 Malenas finaste sommar, 1967
 Malena och glädjen, 1969
 Malena, 11 år, 1975
 Toffe och Andrea, 1976
 Andrea + 6 cm, Toffe + 7 cm, 1977
 Kottens bakvända B, 1978
 Du klarar det, Kotten, 1978
 Kotten vågar inte gå hem, 1978
 Vem tar hand om Kotten?, 1979
 Toffe och Andrea i sommarskogen, 1979
 Kalla mig Robban, 1979
 Det var ditt fel Robban, 1980
 Hugg i, Robban, 1981     
 Marielle och Madame, 1982
 Marielle och Vera-Teresa, 1983
 Columbus och Matilda, 1984
 Av pappa, så klart! 1984
 Columbus klass 1B, 1985
 Min katt heter Mirre Sundström: verser på lek och allvar, 1985
 Det var inte jag, 1988
 Du misstar dig Sanna, 1988
 Vuokko Vendela Kristofferson, 1989
 Stora planer, Sanna, 1990
 Spöket James och benbrotten, 1992
 Milligram och småspökena, 1993
 Nikodemus, 1995
 Festa och fira!: årets högtider förr och nu, 1995
 Teater! Teater!, 1998
 Majali i juni månad'', 2000

Awards
 1970: Swedish Literature Society prize
 1973: National Literature Prize
 1975: National Literature Prize
 1975: Bonniers children's scholarship
 1980: Swedish Literature Society prize
 1981: Swedish People's School Friends of Culture Prize
 1982: Topelius Prize
 1985: Swedish Authors' Fund prize
 1989: State Children Cultural
 1990: Nygrénska Foundation prize
 1999: Cultural Foundation prize
 2008: The Längman Culture Foundation Prize

See also

References

Sources
 Uppslagsverket Finland. 
 Swedish and Finnish Wikipedia
 Biography.

1918 births
2016 deaths
Writers from Helsinki
Finnish writers in Swedish
Finnish women novelists
Finnish children's writers
Swedish women children's writers
Swedish children's writers
Finnish women children's writers
20th-century Finnish women writers
20th-century Finnish novelists
20th-century Swedish women